Allan Chapman (18 March 1897 – 7 January 1966) was a Scottish Unionist Party politician.

Chapman was the son of H. Williams Chapman and attended Queens' College, Cambridge. He was elected at the 1935 general election as Member of Parliament (MP) for the Rutherglen constituency in Lanarkshire.  He held the seat during the war years, but at the 1945 general election he was defeated by the Labour Party candidate Gilbert McAllister.

In the war-time coalition government, he was Assistant Postmaster-General from March 1941 to March 1942, and then Under-Secretary of State for Scotland until the coalition government was dissolved in May 1945. In the subsequent caretaker government he then shared the post with Thomas Dunlop Galbraith until the new Labour Government took office at the end of July.

He was married to Beatrice Cox. He died at Dundee Royal Infirmary, age 68.

References

External links 
 

1897 births
1966 deaths
Alumni of Queens' College, Cambridge
Members of the Parliament of the United Kingdom for Scottish constituencies
Ministers in the Churchill caretaker government, 1945
Ministers in the Churchill wartime government, 1940–1945
Place of birth missing
UK MPs 1935–1945
Unionist Party (Scotland) MPs